Gérard Devillard (born 5 February 1940) is a French sailor. He competed in the Finn event at the 1964 Summer Olympics.

References

External links
 

1940 births
Living people
French male sailors (sport)
Olympic sailors of France
Sailors at the 1964 Summer Olympics – Finn
Place of birth missing (living people)
20th-century French people